The Women's LEN Trophy is LEN's second-tier competition for women's water polo clubs. It was first held in 2000 as the LEN Women's Cup Winners' Cup. It was contested for many seasons by around 15 teams, which could qualify for it either directly due to high ranking in their domestic league or by being eliminated at certain stages of the Champions' Cup. After the last reformations in the European competitions system by LEN, only four teams contesting for the trophy, coming after elimination at that season's LEN Euro League quarterfinals stage. Italy's Gifa Palermo, Ortigia, Racing Roma, Imperia, Russia's Shturm Ruza, and Greece's Ethnikos are the most successful clubs in the competition with two titles each.

Title holders 

 1999–00:  Gifa Palermo
 2000–01:  SKIF Moscow
 2001–02:  Gifa Palermo
 2002–03:  Vouliagmeni
 2003–04:  Ortigia
 2004–05:  Ortigia
 2005–06:  Honvéd
 2006–07:  Racing Roma
 2007–08:  Racing Roma
 2008–09:  Shturm Chekhov
 2009–10:  Ethnikos
 2010–11:  Rapallo
 2011–12:  Imperia
 2012–13:  Shturm 2002
 2013–14:  Olympiacos
 2014–15:  Imperia
 2015–16:  Mataró
 2016–17:  UVSE
 2017–18:  Dunaújváros
 2018–19:  Orizzonte Catania
 2019–20: Cancelled due to COVID-19 pandemic
 2020–21:  Kinef Kirishi
 2021–22:  Ethnikos

Finals 

Source: LEN (from 2000 to 2016).

Titles by club

Titles by nation

References

External links
 Women’s LEN Trophy

 
Recurring sporting events established in 2000
LEN club water polo competitions
Women's water polo competitions
Multi-national professional sports leagues